Bryn is a village in Ivano-Frankivsk Raion of Ivano-Frankivsk Oblast in Western Ukraine. It belongs to Halych urban hromada, one of the hromadas of Ukraine. The population of the village is about 706 people and the local government is administered by Brynska village council.

Geography 

History and attractions 
The first written record of the village dates from 1555. However, several burial places of the Carpathian Kurgan culture (4th–5th centuries) and a Kievan Rus' mound have been found in the village territory. The village preserves the wooden Church of the Transfiguration of the Blessed St. Nicholas that was built in 1863.

Until 18 July 2020, Bryn belonged to Halych Raion. The raion was abolished in July 2020 as part of the administrative reform of Ukraine, which reduced the number of raions of Ivano-Frankivsk Oblast to six. The area of Halych Raion was merged into Ivano-Frankivsk Raion.

Famous people 
Joseph Nyzhankivsky (1836–1911), the father of Ostap Nyzhankivsky, is buried in the village.

References

External links 
 Северина Нижанківська / Газета Галицька Зоря.— Дрогобич 
 с. Бринь. Не свідок історії. Учасник. Ірина Федоляк 
 weather.in.ua/Bryn' (Ivano-Frankivsk region)

Villages in Ivano-Frankivsk Raion